Pasupuleti Kannamba (Pasupulēţi Kannāṃba) (5 October 1911 – 7 May 1968) was an Indian actress, playback singer and film producer of Telugu cinema, of Andhra Pradesh, India. She acted in more than 170 films and produced about 25 films in Telugu and Tamil languages during the 1930s to the 1960s.

Career
Kannamba was born in Eluru. She started acting in dramas at the age of 13. She performed many characters such as Sati Savitri, Anasuya and Chandramati.

Her film career began with the Chandramati character in Harishchandra (1935) of Star Combines. She acted in about 150 films and won accolades for her roles in Draupadi Vastrapaharanam, Kanakataara, Saranagadhara, Gruhalakshmi and Chandika. She acted in the title role of Kannagi in Tamil and in Palnati Yudham as Nayakuralu Nagamma, opposite Govindarajula Subba Rao. She acted in Ashok Kumar (1941) as Queen, opposite another great actor, V. Nagayya. She acted together with P. U. Chinnappa in many movies, such as Kannagi, Mahamaya, Harischandra and Tulasi Jalandhar.

She married Kadaru Nagabhushanam in 1941. They established "Raja Rajeswari Films" and produced about 30 films, including Sumati, Padhuka Pattabhishekam, Saudamani, Peda Raitu, Lakshmi, Sri Krishna Tulabharam, Sati Sakkubhai and Sati Anasuya. Their movie Navajeevanam (1949) was awarded as the best film by Combined Madras state.

She died on 7 May 1964.

Filmography

Actress
This is the complete list of her films compiled by H. Ramesh Babu.

Playback singer
These are some of the Telugu songs voiced by her for the films.

Producer
She has produced about 25–30 films along with her husband Kadaru Nagabhushanam under the banners of Sri Rajarajeswari films, Rajasri pictures and Sri Varalakshmi films.

References

External links
 

1911 births
1964 deaths
Indian women playback singers
Indian film actresses
Telugu playback singers
20th-century Indian actresses
20th-century Indian singers
Actresses from Andhra Pradesh
Singers from Andhra Pradesh
Indian women film producers
Film producers from Andhra Pradesh
20th-century Indian businesspeople
Telugu film producers
Tamil film producers
Actresses in Tamil cinema
Actresses in Telugu cinema
Indian stage actresses
Actresses in Telugu theatre
Indian child actresses
Child actresses in Telugu cinema
20th-century Indian women singers
Film musicians from Andhra Pradesh
Businesswomen from Andhra Pradesh
20th-century Indian businesswomen
Women musicians from Andhra Pradesh